Nikolai Nikolaeff (born 26 December 1981) is an Australian actor who is best known for his roles in the television series Sea Patrol, Power Rangers Jungle Fury and Daredevil.

Nikolaeff was born in Melbourne, and is of Russian and Ukrainian descent. He began acting at the age of twelve and enrolled into the Victorian Youth Theatre. He attended school at Caulfield Grammar School and at sixteen, Nikolaeff landed a lead role in Crash Zone which led to a number of roles in other children's television series. He took an Arts degree at Monash University in Caulfield.

Filmography

Films

Television
 Stranger Things (Season 4) – Russian Prison Guard (2022)
NCIS (TV Series) – Xavier Zovotov - On fire - Season 17 Episode 14 (2020)
NCIS New Orleans as Luca Osman – Season 5 Episode 23 – (2019 – The River Styx, part I)
Six – Prince (2018)
Fargo – Drug Dealer (2017: "The Law of Non-Contradiction")
The OA – Mr. Azarov (2016) 
Daredevil – Vladimir (2015)
Camp – David "Cole" Coleman, the camp's maintenance guy (2013)
Sea Patrol – Leo '2Dads' Kosov-Meyer (2009–2011)
The Pacific – Rear Echelon Man (2009)
Power Rangers Jungle Fury – Dominic/Rhino Ranger (14 episodes, 2008)
Mark Loves Sharon – Robbie Kane (1 episode, 2008)
Canal Road – Vladimir (2 episodes, 2008)
Forged – Juda (2006)
Penicillin: The Magic Bullet – James
Scooter: Secret Agent – Ed (1 episode, 2005)
Wicked Science (26 episodes, 2005–2006)
Stingers – Slug (1 episode, 2004)
Blue Heelers – Aiden Wiltshire/Stephen Chernov (2 episodes, 1999–2004)
The Saddle Club – Drew Regnery (19 episodes, 2003)
Subterano – Todd (2003)
Crash Zone – Mike Hansen (26 episodes, 1999–2001)
Pig's Breakfast – Nick (3 episodes, 2000–2001)
Eugenie Sandler P.I. – Bogdan (1 episode, ????)
Round the Twist – Snorrison (2 episodes, 2000)
High Flyers – Nick (1999)

Video games

See also
 List of Caulfield Grammar School people

References

External links
 Official website
 

1981 births
Living people
People educated at Caulfield Grammar School
Australian male television actors
Monash University alumni
Australian people of Russian descent
Australian people of Ukrainian descent
Male actors from Melbourne